Church of Saint Blaise is a Catholic parish church located in the Lower Town of Zagreb, Croatia. It is dedicated to the Saint Blaise, and was designed by the Croatian architect Viktor Kovačić in the eclectic style. It is notable for its cuppola, made out of reinforced concrete, first of its kind in the region.

References

External links

 http://www.svblaz.hr/

Religious buildings and structures in Zagreb
Basilica churches in Croatia
Roman Catholic churches completed in 1915
Church buildings with domes
20th-century Roman Catholic church buildings in Croatia